Too Many Crooks is a 1959 British comedy film directed by Mario Zampi. The plot concerns a bunch of inept crooks who kidnap the wife of a shady businessman, only for him to decide he doesn’t want her back. It stars George Cole, Sidney James and Bernard Bresslaw as members of the gang, alongside Brenda de Banzie as the victim and Terry-Thomas as her husband.

Plot
The members of a gang, especially Sid, grow impatient as their incompetent leader, Fingers, botches the robbery of a fur store, the latest in a series of disasters. Fingers then comes up with the idea of robbing businessman William Gordon. Gordon bluffs them into believing the police are on their way. Fingers refuses to give up, plotting to kidnap Gordon's daughter. However, he errs yet again and ends up with Gordon's meek wife Lucy instead.

Thinking she will do just as well, Fingers demands £25,000 ransom for her safe return. To his surprise, Gordon gleefully refuses. The philanderer has been carrying on an affair with his secretary and would like nothing better than to be rid of his dowdy wife. Fingers desperately lowers his price over and over again, finally offering to give her back for a mere £200, but is turned down.

When Lucy learns of this, her love for her husband is extinguished. She decides to get revenge and soon takes charge of the gang (her wartime training in unarmed combat coming in handy). Knowing of Gordon's tax dispute with the Inland Revenue and his distrust of banks, she figures out where he has hidden much of his money. She leads the gangsters in stealing the cash and, for good measure, the furs and jewellery Gordon had lavished on his mistress, taking half of the proceeds for her share. On leaving Gordon's house through the bedroom window a lit cigarette is left, which unintentionally burns the house down. Gordon returns and, thinking his money is burning, repeatedly jumps into the burning building.

By coincidence, the next day, the newspapers report a gruesome murder, just like the one Fingers had threatened. Gordon jumps to the wrong conclusion, and Lucy makes him pay some more for his mistake. She has Sid and Fingers impersonate policemen investigating her disappearance. Fingers extorts most of the rest of Gordon's ready cash in exchange for letting the matter drop. When a real Scotland Yard inspector shows up soon after, Gordon loses his temper and raises suspicions of murder.

Desperate, he decides to flee the country. Fingers's ex-stripper girlfriend offers to provide a forged passport. He agrees to meet her later, after visiting his mother. Lucy guesses that he is going there to pick up a final stash of money. The gang shows up and finds him with a suitcase. When the police come to question Gordon further, Fingers takes the suitcase (containing £50,000) and leaves, Gordon being too afraid to raise a fuss. Then Lucy walks in on her now-penniless husband.

Fingers and his gang decide to keep all of this last windfall and not split it with Lucy, but as they drive away, the suitcase pops open unnoticed and the money is scattered on the road.

Cast
Terry-Thomas as William Delaney Gordon - "Bill"
George Cole as Fingers
Brenda De Banzie as Lucy Gordon
Bernard Bresslaw as Snowdrop
Sidney James as Sid
Vera Day as Charmaine
Delphi Lawrence as Beryl
John Le Mesurier as Magistrate
Sydney Tafler as Solicitor
Rosalie Ashley as Angela Gordon
Nicholas Parsons as Tommy Weston
Terry Scott as Fire Policeman
Vilma Ann Leslie as Girl Journalist
Edie Martin as Gordon's mother
Tutte Lemkow as Swarthy Man
John Stuart as Inspector Jensen
Joe Melia as Whisper
Arthur Brough as beggar (uncredited)
Sam Kydd as tramp (uncredited)
Howard Pays as policeman at traffic lights (uncredited)
Victor Brooks Court Usher (uncredited)

Critical reception
In The New York Times, Bosley Crowther described the film as "a good, crazy, brisk farce comedy."

See also
Ruthless People, a 1986 film with a similar plot

References

External links

 
 Too Many Crooks on Rotten Tomatoes - https://www.rottentomatoes.com/m/too_many_crooks

1959 films
1950s crime comedy films
British crime comedy films
British black comedy films
British black-and-white films
Films about kidnapping
Films shot at Pinewood Studios
Films directed by Mario Zampi
1950s black comedy films
1959 comedy films
1959 drama films
1950s English-language films
1950s British films